In corporate finance, net operating profit after tax (NOPAT) is a company's after-tax operating profit for all investors, including shareholders and debt holders. NOPAT is used by analysts and investors as a precise and accurate measurement of profitability to compare a company's financial results across its history and against competitors.

When calculating NOPAT, one removes Interest Expense and the effects of other non-operating activities (non-recurring gains and losses) from Net Income to arrive at a value that approximates the value of a firm's annual earnings. NOPAT is precisely calculated as:

NOPAT = (Net Income - after-tax Non-operating Gains + after-tax Non-operating Losses + after-tax Interest Expense)

NOPAT doesn’t include one-time losses and other non-recurring charges, because they don’t represent the true, ongoing profitability of the business. For example, a company may incur acquisition costs that would not be expected to occur in the future. These costs would negatively affect current year earnings, but do not accurately portray the operations of the firm. These costs should be excluded when performing any type of analysis to determine the operating and financial efficiency of a firm or to compare performance against other firms.

For a rough calculation, NOPAT approximates earnings before interest after taxes (EBIAT).

The rough calculation for NOPAT is: NOPAT = Operating profit x (1 - Tax Rate)

NOPAT is frequently used in calculations of Economic value added and Free cash flow.

Numerical example

Financing approach

See also 
Economic value added
Free cash flow
Financial statement analysis

References

External sources
 

Corporate finance
Fundamental analysis
Profit